Boothia Peninsula (formerly Boothia Felix, Inuktitut Kingngailap Nunanga) is a large peninsula in Nunavut's northern Canadian Arctic, south of Somerset Island. The northern part, Murchison Promontory, is the northernmost point of mainland Canada.

Geography
Bellot Strait (Ikirahaq) separates the peninsula from Somerset Island to the north. Babbage Bay is on the east coast, as is Abernethy Bay, just to the south. The community of Taloyoak lies in the far south and is the peninsula's only significant population centre. Paisley Bay is on the west coast, as is Wrottesley Inlet (between Paisley Bay and Bellot Strait).

Prior to the detachment of Nunavut in 1999, the Boothia Peninsula and the nearby Melville Peninsula were the only parts of mainland Canada that belonged to the District of Franklin in the then Northwest Territories.  The balance of the District of Franklin was all situated within the Arctic Archipelago.

Exploration
John Ross was forced by ice to stop for four years at its easternmost point starting in 1829. He named it after his patron Sir Felix Booth. Ross encountered a large Inuit community whom he described as living in "snow cottages" (i.e., igloos) and immortalized in Ross's painting North Hendon.  In 1831, his nephew James Clark Ross went overland and reached the north magnetic pole which was then on its western side. He also crossed west to King William Island.

Henry Larsen's second successful traverse of the Northwest Passage passed through the Bellot Strait.  
Larsen deemed the strait too shallow for larger vessels and described how his vessel was almost crushed by ice floes when there was a change in the wind's direction.  On his return voyage Larsen passed north of Somerset Island.

References

Further reading

 Christie, Robert Loring. Three New Lower Paleozoic Formations of the Boothia Peninsula Region, Canadian Arctic Archipelago. [Ottawa]: Dept. of Energy, Mines and Resources, 1973.
 Dease, Peter Warren, and William Barr. From Barrow to Boothia The Arctic Journal of Chief Factor Peter Warren Dease, 1836–1839. [Rupert's Land Record Society series, 7]. Montreal: McGill-Queen's University Press, 2002. 
 Dyke, Arthur S. Quaternary Geology of Boothia Peninsula and Northern District of Keewatin, Central Canadian Arctic. Ottawa, Ont., Canada: Geological Survey of Canada, 1984. 
 Gunn, A., B. Fournier, and R. Morrison. Seasonal Movements and Distribution of Satellite-Collared Caribou Cows on the Boothia and Simpson Peninsula Areas, Northwest Territories, 1991-93. Yellowknife, NWT: Dept. of Resources, Wildlife, and Economic Development, Govt. of the Northwest Territories, 2000.
 Lawrence, M. J. A Survey of Aquatic Resources of the District of Keewatin and Boothia Peninsula. Ottawa: Environmental-Social Program, Northern Pipelines, 1978.
 Markham, Albert Hastings, and Sherard Osborn. A Whaling Cruise to Baffin's Bay and the Gulf of Boothia. And an Account of the Rescue of the Crew of the "Polaris.". London: S. Low, Marston, Low, and Searle, 1875.
 VanStone, James W., James E. Anderson, and C. F. Merbs. An Archaeological Collection from Somerset Island and Boothia Peninsula, N.W.T. Toronto, 1962.
 Zabenskie, Susan, and Konrad Gajewski. 2007. "Post-Glacial Climatic Change on Boothia Peninsula, Nunavut, Canada". Quaternary Research. 68, no. 2: 261.

Peninsulas of Kitikmeot Region
Former populated places in the Kitikmeot Region